Tonga, by a modification of its treaty of friendship with the United Kingdom in July 1970, is responsible for its own external affairs. It maintains cordial relations with most countries and has close relations with its Pacific neighbours and the United Kingdom. In 1998, it recognized the People's Republic of China and broke relations with Taiwan.

Diplomatic relations 

List of countries which Tonga maintains diplomatic relations with:

Regional relations

Tonga maintains strong regional ties in the Pacific. It is a full member of the Pacific Islands Forum, the South Pacific Applied Geoscience Commission, the South Pacific Tourism Organisation, the Pacific Regional Environment Programme and the Secretariat of the Pacific Community.  Tonga endorsed the Treaty of Rarotonga (the South Pacific Nuclear Free Zone Treaty) in 1996.

Tonga is, however, notably not one of the eight signatories of the Nauru Agreement Concerning Cooperation in the Management of Fisheries of Common Interest which collectively controls 25–30% of the world's tuna supply and approximately 60% of the western and central Pacific tuna supply.

Since November 2011, Tonga has been one of the eight founding members of Polynesian Leaders Group, a regional grouping intended to cooperate on a variety of issues including culture and language, education, responses to climate change, and trade and investment.

Extra-regional relations

Tonga was admitted to full membership of the Commonwealth of Nations in 1970, upon regaining its independence from British protection.

Since it has always had its own monarch, its position in the Commonwealth was rather unusual.

Tonga is an independent native Commonwealth monarchy like Brunei, Lesotho, Malaysia, and Swaziland.
 
Tonga was admitted to the United Nations in 1999.

Additionally outside the region, Tonga is a member or participant of the ACP, Asian Development Bank, Economic and Social Commission for Asia and the Pacific (ESCAP), the Food and Agriculture Organization (FAO), the G-77, the International Bank for Reconstruction and Development, the International Civil Aviation Organization, the International Red Cross and Red Crescent Movement, the International Development Association, the International Finance Corporation, International Hydrographic Organization, the IMF, the International Maritime Organization, Interpol, the International Olympic Committee, the ITU, the NAM, the UPU, the World Meteorological Organization and the World Trade Organization.

Bilateral relations

Commonwealth of Nations

Tonga has been a member of the Commonwealth of Nations since 4 June 1970.

Tonga was a British protected monarchy from 1900 to 1970, when it became an independent native monarchy within the Commonwealth of Nations, a status shared by Brunei, Lesotho, Malaysia, and Eswatini, which also have their own native monarchs.

Current foreign policy

Tonga's foreign policy as of January 2009 has been described by Matangi Tonga as "Look East" – namely, as establishing closer diplomatic and economic relations with Asia (which actually lies to the north-west of the Pacific kingdom). Tonga retains cordial relations with the United States. Although it remains on good terms with the United Kingdom, the two countries do not maintain particularly close relations, and the United Kingdom closed its High Commission in Tonga in 2006. Tonga's relations with Oceania's regional powers, Australia and New Zealand, are very good.

International disputes 

In 1972, Tonga laid claim to, and invaded, the tide-washed, isolated Minerva Reefs, some 480 kilometres southwest of Nuku'olofa, to thwart efforts by a private group, Ocean Life Research Foundation, to establish an independent Republic of Minerva (now the Principality of Minerva) on the reefs and surrounding quays. In November 2005, Fiji laid a complaint with the International Seabed Authority claiming ownership of the reefs.

See also

List of diplomatic missions in Tonga
List of diplomatic missions of Tonga

References 

 
Tonga and the Commonwealth of Nations